TheatreWorks is an independent international performance company based in Singapore. It is an Institute of Public Character. It is currently led by Artistic Director, Ong Keng Sen.

TheatreWorks was established in 1985 by Lim Siauw Chong, Lim Kay Tong and Justin Hill at 72-13, a heritage building that was once a rice warehouse on Mohamed Sultan Road and next to the Singapore River.

Since establishment, the company has staged over 200 productions and 2,500 performances in Singapore and overseas.

After 1999, TheatreWorks hosts and manages the Arts Network Asia (ANA).

References

External links

72-13
Arts Network Asia (ANA)

1985 establishments in Singapore
Theatre in Singapore
Theatre companies in Singapore